Leo Dillon (March 2, 1933 – May 26, 2012) and Diane Dillon (née Sorber; born March 13, 1933) were American illustrators of children's books and adult paperback book and magazine covers. One obituary of Leo called the work of the husband-and-wife team "a seamless amalgam of both their hands". In more than 50 years, they created more than 100 speculative fiction book and magazine covers together as well as much interior artwork. Essentially all of their work in that field was joint.

The Dillons won the Caldecott Medal in 1976 and 1977, the only consecutive awards of the honor. In 1978 they were runners-up for the Hans Christian Andersen Award for children's illustrators; they were the U.S. nominee again in 1996.

Biography

Leo Dillon, of Trinidadian immigrant parentage, was born and raised in East New York.  He enlisted in the Navy for three years' service so that he could attend art school. He credited his interest in art and his inspiration to become an artist to his friend and mentor, Ralph Volman. Diane Sorber hails from the Greater Los Angeles Area where her interest in art was encouraged early by her mother, who was a pianist. The couple met at the Parsons School of Design in New York City in 1953 — where they "became instant archrivals and remained together from then on". They graduated in 1956 and married the next year. This union resulted in an artistic collaboration, which the couple described as a third artist. Diane Dillon explained this in an interview through these words:  “We could look at ourselves as one artist rather than two individuals, and that third artist was doing something neither one of us would do. We let it flow the way it flows when an artist is working by themselves and a color goes down that they didn’t quite expect and that affects the next colors they use, and it seems to have a life of its own.”

An association with writer Harlan Ellison led to jobs doing book covers for his short story collections and both cover and interior woodcut illustration for his anthology Dangerous Visions. They illustrated a large number of mass market paperback book covers for the original Ace Science Fiction Specials, for which they won their first major award, science fiction's 1971 Hugo Award for Best Professional Artist. A detailed biography and introduction to their work and styles were written by Byron Preiss in a book he edited in 1981, entitled The Art of Leo & Diane Dillon. They once described their work as incorporating motifs derived from their respective heritages.  This can be demonstrated in their work for Margaret Musgrove's Ashanti to Zulu, which used tribal motifs and combined historical with contemporary styles.

On May 28, 2012, Ellison reported on his website his reception of a phone call from Diane announcing Leo's death at the age of 79 from lung cancer two days prior. Spectrum Fantastic Art, an annual art competition and art book project of which the couple were general managers, confirmed Leo's death on its website. The obituary of Leo in The New York Times praised the Dillons jointly as "one of the world's pre-eminent illustrators for young people, producing artwork — praised for its vibrancy, ecumenicalism and sheer sumptuous beauty — that was a seamless amalgam of both their hands", also noting the ethnoracial diversity of characters in the Dillons' work in the 1970s, "until then, the smiling faces portrayed in picture books had been overwhelmingly white."

The Dillons had one surviving son. Lee (Lionel John Dillon III), born 1965, became an artist and collaborated with his parents several times, including the illustrations for Pish, Posh, Said Hieronymus Bosch by Nancy Willard (1991). Both Leo and Diane lived in the Cobble Hill neighborhood at the time of Leo's death.

Picture books illustrated by Leo and Diane Dillon

1970 The Ring in the Prairie, written by John Bierhorst / Dial Press
1972 Honey, I Love, Eloise Greenfield / Viking
1973  Blast Off, Linda C. Cain and Susan Rosenbaum / Xerox
1974 Whirlwind Is a Ghost Dancing, compiled by Natalia Maree Belting / Dutton
1974 Songs and Stories from Uganda, W. Moses Serwadda, Hewitt Pantaleoni / World Music Press
1974 The Third Gift, Jan R. Carew / Little Brown
1975 The Hundred Penny Box, Sharon Bell Mathis / Viking
1975 Song of the Boat, Lorenz B. Graham / Crowell
1976 Why Mosquitoes Buzz in People's Ears, Verna Aardema / Dial Press
1977 Ashanti to Zulu: African Traditions, Margaret Musgrove / Dial Press
1977 Who's in Rabbit's House: A Masai Tale, Verna Aardema / Dial Press
1980 Two Pair of Shoes, P. L. Travers / Viking Press
1980 Children of the Sun, Jan R. Carew / Little Brown
1985 Brother to the Wind, Mildred Pitts Walter / Lothrop, Lee & Shepard Books
1986 All in a Day, Mitsumasa Anno and Raymond Briggs / Hamish Hamilton (London) (Translation of: Marui chikyū no maru ichinichi.) —illustrations by 10 artists, including the Dillons
1987 The Porcelain Cat, Michael Patrick Hearn / Little Brown
1989 The Color Wizard, Barbara Brenner / Bantam Little Rooster
1990 The Tale of the Mandarin Ducks, Katherine Paterson / Lodestar
1990 Aïda, Leontyne Price / Harcourt Brace Jovanovich
1991 The Race of the Golden Apples, Claire Martin / Dial Books for Young Readers
1991 Pish, Posh, Said Hieronymus Bosch, Nancy Willard / Harcourt Brace Jovanovich
1992 Northern Lullaby, Nancy White Carlstrom / Putnam
1992 Switch on the Night, Ray Bradbury / Knopf
1993 The Sorcerer's Apprentice, Nancy Willard / Scholastic/Blue Sky Press
1994 What Am I?, N. N. Charles / Scholastic/Blue Sky Press
1997 To Everything There is a Season, the Dillons / Scholastic/Blue Sky Press
1999 Wind Child, Shirley Rousseau Murphy / HarperCollins
2000 Switch on the Night, Ray Bradbury / Knopf (reissue)
2000 The Girl Who Spun Gold, Virginia Hamilton / Scholastic/Blue Sky Press
2001 Two Little Trains, Margaret Wise Brown / HarperCollins
2002 Rap a Tap Tap: Here's Bojangles—Think of That, written and illustrated by the Dillons / Scholastic/Blue Sky Press
2003 One Winter's Night, John Herman / Philomel
2004 Where Have You Been?, Margaret Wise Brown / HarperCollins
2005 The People Could Fly - The Picture Book
2005 Earth Mother, Ellen B. Jackson / Walker & Company
2006 Whirlwind is a Spirit Dancing, Natalia Maree Belting and Joseph Bruchac / Milk & Cookies Press —illustrations reprinted from 1974 title, Whirlwind is a Ghost Dancing
2007 Mother Goose numbers on the loose / Harcourt
2007 Jazz on a Saturday Night / Blue Sky Press
2009 The Goblin and the Empty Chair / Viking Australia
2009 Mama Says: A Book of Love for Mothers and Sons
2011 The Secret River, Marjorie Kinnan Rawlings / Atheneum Books for Young Readers (reissue)

Picture books illustrated only by Diane Dillon
2018 I Can Be Anything! Don’t Tell Me I Can’t

Chapter books illustrated by Leo and Diane Dillon
1962 Mother Night, Kurt Vonnegut, Jr / Fawcett Publications/Gold Medal Books
1964 The Sea and the Jungle, H. M. Tomlinson / Time / Time Reading Program Special Edition
1964 Hakon of Rogen's Saga, Erik Christian Haugaard / Houghton Mifflin
1965 A Slave's Tale Haugaard, Erik Christian Haugaard / Houghton Mifflin
1967 Claymore and Kilt, Sorche Nic Leodhas / Holt, Rinehart, Winston
1968 Shamrock and Spear Pilkington / Holt, Rinehart, Winston
1968 The Rider and His Horse, Erik Christian Haugaard / Houghton Mifflin
1969 The Preserving Machine, Philip K. Dick / Ace Books
1971 The Untold Tale, Erik Christian Haugaard / Houghton Mifflin
1971 The Search Murray / Thomas / Scholastic
1974 Burning Star, Eth Clifford / Houghton Mifflin
1977 The Planets / Time Life Books
1979 A Wrinkle In Time, Madeleine L'Engle / (reissue)
1984 The Enchanted World: Legends of Valor / Time Life Books
1985 The People Could Fly: American Black Folktales, Virginia Hamilton / Knopf
1985 The Enchanted World: Magical Beasts / Time Life Books
1987 Wise Child, Monica Furlong / Knopf
1988 Sing A Song of Popcorn: Every Child's Book of Poems Beatrice Schenk de Regniers / Scholastic — illustrated by many artists
1989 Moses' Ark, Alice Bach and J. Cheryl Exum / Delacorte Press
1991 Juniper, Monica Furlong / Random House
1991 Miriam's Well, Bach and Exum / Delacorte Press
1992 Many Thousand Gone, Virginia Hamilton / Knopf
1993 It's Kwaanza Time Goss Putnam 
1995 Her Stories, Virginia Hamilton / Scholastic / Blue Sky Press
1995 Sabriel, Garth Nix / HarperCollins
1997 The Girl Who Dreamed Only Geese, Howard A. Norman / Harcourt Brace & Co
2000 20,000 Leagues Under the Sea, Jules Verne / HarperCollins (reissue)
2001 Mansa Musa, Khephra Burns / Harcourt Brace & Co
2001 Lirael, Garth Nix / HarperCollins
2003 Abhorsen, Garth Nix / HarperCollins
2004 Between Heaven and Earth: Bird Tales From Around The World, Howard A. Norman / Harcourt Brace & Co
2004 Colman, Monica Furlong / Random House

Awards
1971 Hugo Award for Best Professional Artist
1976 Caldecott Medal – American Library Association – Why Mosquitoes Buzz In People's Ears by Verna Aardema
1977 Caldecott Medal - American Library Association – Ashanti To Zulu: African Traditions by Margaret Musgrove
1977 Hamilton King Award – Society Of Illustrators
1978 Highly Commended runner-up as a duo, Hans Christian Andersen Award (body of work, children's book illustration)
1982 Balrog Award For Lifetime Contribution To Science Fiction/Fantasy
1982 Art Ninth Annual Lensman Award
1986 Coretta Scott King Award illustrator honor
1988 Third Annual Keene State College Children's Literature Festival Award
1991 Doctorate Of Fine Art Degree – Parsons School Of Design
1992 Empire State Award For Children's And Adult Literature For Body Of Work
1992 Society Of Illustrators Gold Medal For Northern Lullaby From The Original Art Show Of Children's Picture Books
1996 U.S. nominee as a duo, Hans Christian Andersen Award (body of work, children's book illustration)
1997 Chesley Award For Best Science Fiction Hardcover Jacket Titled Sabriel
1997 The Grand Masters Award - For Body Of Work - From Spectrum - The Best In Contemporary Fantastic Art
1997 Society of Illustrators Hall Of Fame - Inducted By A Jury of Peers
2002 Virginia Hamilton Literary Award - For Body Of Work
2003 Coretta Scott King Illustrator Honor- For Rap A Tap Tap Here's Bojangles-Think Of That
2005 Coretta Scott King Illustrator Honor Award - For The People Could Fly-The Picture Book
2006 Knickerbocker Award - For Body Of Work - New York Library Association
2006 Doctorate Of Fine Arts - Montserrat School Of Art
2008 World Fantasy Convention Life Achievement Award
2012 BolognaRagazzi Award - Fiction Honorable Mention - The Secret River

Notes

References

Further reading
Borea, P., & J. Janow. "Leo and Diane Dillon." Communication Arts Magazine 25: pp. 42–51, May/June 1983.
Brodie, Carolyn S. "Creators of Magic on Paper: Leo and Diane Dillon," School Library Media Activities Monthly 15(6): pp. 46–48, February 1999.
Cooper, Ilene. "The Walk of Life." Booklist 95(3): pp. 344–347, October 1, 1998.
Davies, Anne. "Talking with Leo & Diane Dillon", Book Links 14(3): pp. 45–48, 2005.
Davis, SE. "One + One = Three." Step-By-Step Graphics 13: pp. 30–41, 1997.
Deines, Ryah. "An Interview with Leo & Diane Dillon," World Fantasy Convention (Calgary, Alberta, Canada). Mystery in Fantasy & Horror (Souvenir Program), pp. 68–71, 2008.
Haber, Karen. "Leo & Diane Dillon: The Third Artist Rules", Locus 44(4), n471: pp. 4–5, 67–70, 2000.
Preiss, Byron, ed. The Art of Leo and Diane Dillon. New York: Ballantine Books, Trade Paperback, Hardcover and Collectors Limited Edition, Fall 1981.
Reichardt, Randy. "Tribute to Leo & Diane Dillon," World Fantasy Convention (Calgary, Alberta, Canada). Mystery in Fantasy & Horror (Souvenir Program), pp. 45–46, 2008.
Wills, F. H. "Leo und Diane Dillon," New York: grafik fur popular-wissenschaftliche werke {with English and French tr}. Novum Gebrauchsgraphik, pp. 50–56, March 1968.

External links

 
 
 Leo Dillon at Library of Congress Authorities —with 64 catalog records
 
 Diane Dillon at LC Authorities
 
 L + D Dillon  at JVJ Publishing Illustrators
 
 

American children's writers
American speculative fiction artists
American children's book illustrators
Caldecott Medal winners
Fantasy artists
Hugo Award-winning artists
Science fiction artists
Married couples
Art duos